Wing Commander Peter Olver, DFC (4 April 191714 February 2013) was a British World War II Royal Air Force  Battle of Britain Supermarine Spitfire fighter ace.

Biography

Olver was born in Royal Leamington Spa, Warwickshire. He trained as a pilot after joining the RAF Volunteer Reserve and joined No. 611 Squadron RAF in September 1940 as a Pilot Officer. He then joined No. 603 Squadron RAF based at RAF Hornchurch. On 25 October 1940 he bailed out of his Spitfire II P7309 near Brede, Sussex on his first sortie after being attacked by a Messerschmitt Bf 109 and was injured on landing. He quickly recovered and after claiming his first kill he joined No. 66 Squadron RAF with which he shot down at least three more aircraft. 
After posting to North Africa he became the commander of No. 238 Squadron RAF and No. 213 Squadron RAF flying the Hawker Hurricane and destroyed three Italian biplane fighters on the ground. Awarded the DFC, he commanded 1 Squadron SAAF flying MK V Spitfires, destroyed an Italian Macchi C.202 fighter and was promoted to Wing Commander when the existing commander was killed. Following the Allied invasion of Sicily he shot down an Bf 109 but was then himself attacked and crash landed. He then spent the remainder of the war as a PoW in camps, including Stalag Luft III.

Later life
He married a Women's Auxiliary Air Force Officer and left the RAF to become a farmer in Kenya. After Kenyan Independence he returned to the UK where he farmed in Devon and Wiltshire. He had four sons.

References

British World War II prisoners of war
British World War II flying aces
British World War II pilots
English aviators
People from Leamington Spa
Royal Air Force wing commanders
Royal Air Force Volunteer Reserve personnel of World War II
Recipients of the Distinguished Flying Cross (United Kingdom)
The Few
1917 births
2013 deaths
Military personnel from Warwickshire